Reginald Broomby (6 January 1905 – 10 May 1984) was an Australian cricketer. He played two first-class matches for Tasmania between 1932 and 1933.

See also
 List of Tasmanian representative cricketers

References

External links
 

1905 births
1984 deaths
Australian cricketers
Tasmania cricketers
Cricketers from Launceston, Tasmania